Edda L. Fields-Black (born Edda L. Fields) is an African-American historian who is currently Associate Professor of History at Carnegie Mellon University. She is known for her research on West African rice agriculture and societies and the African diaspora.

Early life
Raised in Miami, Fields-Black grew up with her paternal grandparents, Jim Fields and Mamie Fields, who were Gullah speakers from Green Pond, South Carolina.

Education
Fields-Black earned a BA degree in English and History from Emory University and an MA degree in History from the University of Florida, before earning MA and PhD degrees from the University of Pennsylvania, where she wrote her dissertation on the anthropology of rice farmers in the Nunez River region of Guinea.

Research
Apart from her research on rice agriculture in coastal Guinea and Sierra Leone, Fields-Black has also performed research on the Gullah Geechee people, the Trans-Atlantic slave trade, and other topics in African-American history.

Fields-Black is also known for her work on the Rio Nunez languages, Nalu language, Mel languages, and other Atlantic languages of West Africa.

Publications
Fields-Black's books include Deep Roots: Rice Farmers in West Africa and the African Diaspora and the co-edited volume Rice: Global Networks and New Histories. She is currently completing a study on Harriet Tubman during the Civil War, enslaved Lowcountry rice laborers, and the Combahee River Raid.

Fields-Black, Edda L. Deep Roots: Rice Farmers in West Africa and the African Diaspora. (Blacks in the Diaspora.) Bloomington: Indiana University Press, 2008.
Bray, Francesca, Peter A. Coclanis, Edda L. Fields-Black, and Dagmar Schäfer. Editors. Rice: Global Networks and New Histories. New York: Cambridge University Press, 2015.

Personal life
She is married to Samuel Black, a historian, curator, and archivist who is director of African-American programs at the Senator John Heinz History Center. The pair was featured together in an episode of StoryCorps in 2006; Samuel talks to Edda Fields-Black about his relationships with his father and work throughout the episode, which aired on NPR's Morning Edition.

See also
Rio Nunez languages
Mel languages
Oryza glaberrima

References

External links
Personal website
Faculty page at Carnegie Mellon University

Living people
African-American historians
Carnegie Mellon University faculty
University of Pennsylvania alumni
Researchers in Gullah anthropology
Year of birth missing (living people)